Lac de la Lande is a lake in Vosges, France.

Lakes of Vosges (department)